Sam Wells may refer to:

 Sam Wells (cricketer) (born 1984), New Zealand cricketer
 Sam Wells (filmmaker) (1950–2011), American experimental filmmaker and photographer
 Sam Wells (priest) (born 1965), English priest of the Church of England